Gabriela Dabrowski and Xu Yifan were the defending champions, but chose not to participate this year.

Andrea Sestini Hlaváčková and Barbora Strýcová won the title, defeating Hsieh Su-wei and Laura Siegemund in the final, 6–4, 6–7(7–9), [10–4]

Seeds

Draw

Draw

References

External links
Main draw

Connecticut Open - Doubles
Doubles